Bikkulovo (Biqqol) is a rural locality (a selo) in Bikkulovsky Selsoviet, Miyakinsky District, Bashkortostan, Russia. The population was 200 as of 2010. There are 6 streets.

Geography 
Bikkulovo is located 26 km northeast of Kirgiz-Miyaki (the district's administrative centre) by road. Rassvet is the nearest rural locality.

References 

Rural localities in Miyakinsky District